Conus daucus, common name the carrot cone, is a species of sea snail, a marine gastropod mollusk in the family Conidae, the cone snails and their allies.

Like all species within the genus Conus, these snails are predatory and venomous. They are capable of "stinging" humans, therefore live ones should be handled carefully.

There is one subspecies Conus daucus riosi Petuch, 1986

Description 
The shell length varies between 19 mm and 66 mm. The color of the shell is lemon- or orange-brown, grooved towards the base, with a pale, sometimes interrupted central band, and encircled throughout by rows of small chestnut spots often obsolete. The spire is sometimes maculated with pale chestnut.

Distribution
Locus typicus: From localities cited by Hwass, Clench(1942) selected the Island of Guadeloupe.

This species occurs in the Caribbean Sea, the Gulf of Mexico, off Northeast Brazil, the North Atlantic Ridge, the Red Sea, and in the Indian Ocean off the Mascarene Basin.

Habitat 
The minimum recorded depth for this species is 0 m; the maximum recorded depth is 120 m.

References

Further reading
 Da Motta A.J. & Raybaudi G. (1992) A new Conus (Gastropoda: Conidae) species found in Martinique. Publicacoes Ocasionais da Sociedade Portuguesa de Malacologia 16: 61–64.
 Petuch, E. J., 1992. Molluscan Discoveries from the Tropical Western Atlantic Region (ii). La Conchiglia: International Shell Magazine, 24 (265 ): 10 -15
 Petuch, E. J. 1993a. Molluscan Discoveries from the tropical western Atlantic region. Part II. New species of Conus from the Bahamas Platform, Central American and northern South American coasts, and the Lesser Antilles. La Conchiglia 24(265):10-15, figs. page(s): 15, figs 20-21 
 Filmer R.M. (2001). A Catalogue of Nomenclature and Taxonomy in the Living Conidae 1758 – 1998. Backhuys Publishers, Leiden. 388pp.
 Rosenberg, G., F. Moretzsohn, and E. F. García. 2009. Gastropoda (Mollusca) of the Gulf of Mexico, Pp. 579–699 in Felder, D.L. and D.K. Camp (eds.), Gulf of Mexico–Origins, Waters, and Biota. Biodiversity. Texas A&M Press, College Station, Texas
 Tucker J.K. (2009). Recent cone species database. September 4, 2009 Edition
 Tucker J.K. & Tenorio M.J. (2009) Systematic classification of Recent and fossil conoidean gastropods. Hackenheim: Conchbooks. 296 pp.
 Monnier E. & Limpalaër L. (2016). Revision of the Dauciconus daucus complex (Gastropoda: Conidae). Description of two new species: Dauciconus jacquescolombi n.sp. from Martinique and Dauciconus massemini n.sp. from French Guiana. Xenophora Taxonomy. 13: 6-37.
 Rabiller M. & Richard G. (2019). Conidae offshore de Guadeloupe : Description du matériel dragué lors de l'expédition KARUBENTHOS 2 contenant de nouvelles espèces. Xenophora Taxonomy. 24: 3-31.

External links
 Hwass C.H. (1792). Cone. Conus. Pp. 586-757, in Bruguière J.G.. Encyclopédie méthodique ou par ordre de matières. Histoire naturelle des vers. volume 1. Pancoucke, Paris. [13 Feb. 1792; date after Evenhuis, 2003, Zootaxa, 166: 37; Zootaxa, 207
 Lamarck [J.B.M.de]. (1810). Sur la détermination des espèces parmi les animaux sans vertèbres, et particulièrement parmi les Mollusques testacés. Annales du Muséum d'Histoire Naturelle. 15: 20-40
 Adams A. (1855 ["1854"]). Descriptions of thirty-nine new species of shells, from the collection of Hugh Cuming, Esq. Proceedings of the Zoological Society of London. 22: 130-138, pl. 28
 Green J. (1830). Monograph of the cones of North America, including three new species. Transactions of the Albany Institute. 1: 121-125, pl. 3
 Reeve, L. A. (1844 ["1843"]). Descriptions of new species of shells figured in the ‛Conchologia Iconica'. Proceedings of the Zoological Society of London. 11: 168-197
 The Conus Biodiversity website
 Cone Shells - Knights of the Sea
 
 Puillandre N., Duda T.F., Meyer C., Olivera B.M. & Bouchet P. (2015). One, four or 100 genera? A new classification of the cone snails. Journal of Molluscan Studies. 81: 1-23
 Rosenberg, G.; Moretzsohn, F.; García, E. F. (2009). Gastropoda (Mollusca) of the Gulf of Mexico, Pp. 579–699 in: Felder, D.L. and D.K. Camp (eds.), Gulf of Mexico–Origins, Waters, and Biota. Texas A&M Press, College Station, Texas

daucus
Gastropods described in 1792